Abarema curvicarpa var. rodriguesii is a vulnerable variety of legume, known only from the Adolfo Ducke Forest Reserve near Manaus in Brazil.

References

curvicarpa var. rodriguesii
Endemic flora of Brazil